Ellen Perez and Arina Rodionova were the defending champions, but chose not to participate.

Maddison Inglis and Kaylah McPhee won the title, defeating Naiktha Bains and Tereza Mihalíková in the final, 3–6, 6–2, [10–2].

Seeds

Draw

Draw

References

External Links
Main Draw

Bendigo Women's International - Doubles